RCLS can mean:

  Radio Controlled Lighting System (Pilot Controlled Lighting)
 Reactor Control and Limitation System
 Royal Canadian Logistics Service
 Runway Centerline Light System, see Runway#Technical specifications